Center Street A.M.E. Zion Church is a historic African Methodist Episcopal Zion church located  on S. Center Street in Statesville, Iredell County, North Carolina.  It was built in 1903, and is a one-story, three bay by seven bay, Late Gothic Revival style brick building.  It has a steep gable roof sheathed in pressed tin and features two corner entrance towers of unequal height and a large, pointed arch stained glass window.  The church also goes by the name Mount Pleasant AME Zion Church. 

It was added to the National Register of Historic Places in 1980.

History
The Center Street Church is the oldest church associated with a black congregation in Statesville.  The building is the third associated with the Mount Zion A.M.E. Church, which was formed in 1868 or 1869 after the U.S. Civil War.  The first two buildings were wood frame structures.  The first church leaders were Sidney S. Murdock and Alfred Baily.

Other AME churches in Iredell County
Other AME Zion churches in Iredell County include:  
Shiloh AME Zion Church on Salisbury Road in the Belmont area of Statesville, organized in 1880
Piney Grove AME Zion Church in Harmony
Rocky Creek AME Zion Church in Harmony
Mt. Vernon AME Zion Church in Statesville
Siloam AME Zion Church in Harmony
Elmwood AME Zion Church in Elmwood, organized in 1908

References

African Methodist Episcopal Zion churches in North Carolina
Churches on the National Register of Historic Places in North Carolina
Gothic Revival church buildings in North Carolina
Churches completed in 1903
20th-century Methodist church buildings in the United States
Churches in Iredell County, North Carolina
National Register of Historic Places in Iredell County, North Carolina